Maxence Danet-Fauvel (born 27 June 1993) is a French actor and model.

He is best known for the role of Eliott Demaury in the TV series Skam France, an adaptation of Skam., The House of Gaunt, Police de Caractères.

He started modeling in 2015 and works for Elite Model Management. In 2016, he joined the Actors Factory in Paris.

In 2021, he starred as Tom Riddle in The House of Gaunt: Lord Voldemort Origins, a non-commercial fan film.

References 

1993 births
Living people
21st-century French actors
French male models
French male television actors